Neuhäusel is an Ortsgemeinde – a community belonging to a Verbandsgemeinde – in the Westerwaldkreis in Rhineland-Palatinate, Germany. The community  has been since early 2006 a major investment and activity centre for village renewal.

Geography

Neuhäusel lies in the area of the Augst communities (a small region) and belongs to the Verbandsgemeinde of Montabaur, a kind of collective municipality. Its seat is in the like-named town. Environmentally, Neuhäusel is part of the Lower Westerwald in the Nassau Nature Park.

History
Musbach, which had its first documentary mention in 1198 as Neuhäusel's forerunner, was a small village that lay near where today's Ortsgemeinde lies. It was followed by Neuspay, which had its last documentary mention in 1537, and Wirt beym Creutz, named in 1669. In 1675, the name Neuhäusel appeared for the first time. The community, which in 1789 was joined with the community of Eitelborn, became a separate community on 5 April 1810. Owing to its location on the important traffic link between the Rhine and the Westerwald, Neuhäusel developed over the centuries from a rest stop for travelling people to a community with the character of a centre.

Politics

Community council
The council is made up of 16 council members who were elected in a majority vote in a municipal election on 13 June 2004.
CDU 7 seats
SPD 2 seats
UBG 3 seats
FWV 4 seats

Coat of arms
Trade, transport and the community on both sides of the road are represented in the community's arms by the two half wagon wheels and the silver field in the middle. The old St. Anna-Kirche (church) built in 1877 is shown as a red steeple with a west portal. Saint Donatus is symbolized by a blue sword with a golden grip. The green double flank represents the community's charming location.

Town partnerships
 Sauvigny-les-Bois, Nièvre, France, since 1992

Economy and infrastructure

Transport
The community is linked to the road network through Bundesstraße 49 (Montabaur-Koblenz).

Fire services
The Verbandsgemeinde of Montabaur maintains three fire stations within its limits, one of which is in Neuhäusel. Its response area includes not only Neuhäusel, but also the municipal areas of Eitelborn, Kadenbach and Simmern.

References

External links
Neuhäusel in the collective municipality’s Web pages 

Municipalities in Rhineland-Palatinate
Westerwaldkreis